Satsu may refer to:

 Megumi Satsu (1948–2010), Japanese-French singer
 Satsu Station, a station in Kami, Mikata District, Hyōgo, Japan
 Satsu, Estonia, village in Sonda Parish, Ida-Viru County, Estonia

In fiction
 Satsu (Buffy the Vampire Slayer), a character in Buffy the Vampire Slayer
 Ansatsuken, a Japanese neologism used to describe a martial art made for killing
 Shun Goku Satsu, Akuma's signature technique in the Street Fighter video games